Persicaria foliosa is a species of flowering plant belonging to the family Polygonaceae.

Its native range is Northern and Northeastern Europe to Japan.

References

foliosa